Shawcor Ltd is a Canadian oilfield services company, based in Toronto, Ontario, and listed on the Toronto Stock Exchange. It specializes in providing services to the pipeline sector of the oil and gas market. It is one of the largest pipe-coating providers in the world. In 2017, it had a revenue of $1.56 billion. It was founded by Francis Shaw, the father of the founder of Shaw Communications, and there was substantial ownership in both companies by the Shaw family for many years.

History 
Shawcor was founded in the mid-20th century by Francis Shaw in rural Lambton County. It was originally a construction company, but later expanded into pipeline coatings, cable television, and numerous other businesses. In the 1970s, the business was split between Francis's sons Leslie and JR Shaw; Leslie inherited the pipeline services business, which became the current Shawcor, while JR Shaw inherited the western cable business, which became Shaw Communications. Under Leslie's leadership, the company grew significantly; by 2002, it had a market capitalization of $1 billion, and 43 plants in 20 countries. Around that time, Leslie ceded his leadership of the business to his daughter, Virginia Shaw.

In 2012, Shawcor suggested that it might consider putting itself up for sale. At the time, the company had a market capitalization of about $3 billion. The company eventually decided not to sell, causing to share price to fall 15%. In 2013, it eliminated its dual class share structure, under which the Shaw family controlled the majority of voting shares.

Operations
Shawcor operates through 5 business units: Pipeline Performance (Bredero-Shaw, Socotherm, Canusa-CPS, Dhatec), Composite Production Systems (FlexPipe, Global Poly, FlexFlow, ZCL/Xerxes, Parabeam), Integrity Management (Shaw Pipeline Services, Shawcor Inspection Services, Lake Superior Consulting), Oilfield Asset Management (Guardian, CSI), and Connection Systems (DSG-Canusa, Shawflex). It has about 100 manufacturing and service facilities and sales offices and 6000 employees in 25 countries.

The pipe coating solutions division, which is the largest division in the company, was formerly part of Halliburton, an international oilfield services conglomerate. At that time, it was named Bredero Price. Shawcor acquired the portion of the division it did not already own for $200 million in 2002.

See also
 List of oilfield service companies

References

External links

Companies listed on the Toronto Stock Exchange
Multinational companies
Companies based in Houston
Companies based in Toronto
Energy companies of Canada
Engineering companies of the United States
Oilfield services companies
Paint manufacturers
Coatings
Canadian brands